Mordellistena echingolensis is a beetle in the genus Mordellistena of the family Mordellidae. It was described in 1969 by Ermisch.

References

echingolensis
Beetles described in 1969